Yatai may refer to:

Yatai (food cart), food stall in Japan
Changchun Yatai, Chinese football club
Ji Yatai (1901–1968), Chinese diplomat
Yatai Group, a private conglomerate enterprise in China
Yatai-bayashi, a 1972 traditional taiko piece